The blackish cinclodes (Cinclodes antarcticus) is a passerine bird of the genus Cinclodes belonging to the ovenbird family Furnariidae. It is native to the southern tip of South America including the Falkland Islands where it is known as the tussac-bird or tussock-bird. It is often very tame and will approach humans closely.

Description
It is 18 to 23 cm long. The sexes are similar and their plumage is almost entirely dark brown. The throat is slightly paler with some buff speckling, there is a hint of a pale stripe over the eye and there is a faint reddish-brown bar on the wing. The bill is quite long, stout and slightly downcurved with a pale yellow spot at the base (lacking in Falkland birds).

The song and calls are loud and high-pitched. The trilling song may be uttered from a perch or in flight.

Habitat and range
The blackish cinclodes is a bird of coasts and islands, commonly found among rocks, kelp on beaches and in areas of tussac grass. The nominate subspecies C. a. antarcticus occurs on the Falklands where it is common on many smaller islands but scarce on West and East Falkland where it suffers from predation by introduced cats and rats. The other subspecies C. a. maculirostris is found in southernmost Chile and Argentina on Tierra del Fuego and surrounding islands.

Feeding
The diet consists mainly of small invertebrates but also includes regurgitated fish taken from seabird colonies, crumbs from around human settlements and scraps of carrion. It forages among washed-up seaweed and along the water's edge.

Reproduction
The breeding season lasts from September to December and two broods are often raised. The cup-shaped nest is made of grass, lined with feathers and placed under rocks, grass clumps or buildings or in a hole in the ground. One to three eggs are laid. These are white, sometimes with a few red spots. They are incubated for two weeks and the young birds fledge after another two weeks.

References

 Jaramillo, Alvaro; Burke, Peter & Beadle, David (2003) Field Guide to the Birds of Chile, Christopher Helm, London
 Woods, Robin W. (1988) Guide to Birds of the Falkland Islands, Anthony Nelson, Oswestry

External links

 
 Photos, videos and observations at Cornell Lab of Ornithologys Birds of the World
 Blackish cinclodes, Falklands.net

blackish cinclodes
Birds of the Falkland Islands
Birds of Tierra del Fuego
blackish cinclodes
blackish cinclodes